Squoval may refer to:

A mostly rectangular figure, with rounded corners.

 Squoval nail, a manicured fingernail shape
 A trademarked bicycle frame used by Cervélo

See also
 Squircle